Villa Amalia may refer to:

Villa Amalia (book), a novel by Pascal Quignard
Villa Amalia (film), a 2009 French film based on the novel
Villa Amalia (Athens), an anti-authoritarian squat in Athens, Greece